These may refer to:
the plural proximal demonstrative in English
These, a variation of the Greek Theseus in Etruscan mythology

Etruscan mythology